Yeison Asencio (born November 14, 1989) is a Dominican professional baseball player for the Piratas de Campeche of the Mexican League. He was signed by the San Diego Padres as an international free agent in 2009.

Career

San Diego Padres
Asencio signed with the Padres as an international free agent on July 2, 2009. He used false documents to sign, going by the name "Yoan Alcantra", to portray himself as  years younger than he actually was. He made his professional debut in 2010 with the Dominican Summer League Padres, slashing .241./.332/.395 with 5 home runs and 37 RBI. In 2011, he played for the AZL Padres, logging a batting line of .348/.367/.586 with 7 home runs and 46 RBI. The following year, Asencio played in 92 games for the Single-A Fort Wayne TinCaps, posting a .323/.353/.474 batting line with 8 home runs and 61 RBI.

The Padres added Asencio to their 40-man roster after the 2012 season. In 2013, Asencio represented the Padres at the All-Star Futures Game. He split the 2013 season between the High-A Lake Elsinore Storm and the Double-A San Antonio Missions, accumulating a .277/.307/.401 slash line with 7 home runs and 76 RBI in 131 games. He began the 2014 season with San Antonio, before being promoted to the Triple-A El Paso Chihuahuas on August 11 after Rymer Liriano was promoted to the major leagues. Between the two teams, Asencio slashed .291/.330/.433 with a career-high 15 home runs and 59 RBI. On November 20, 2014, Asencio was designated for assignment by the Padres. On November 25, he cleared waivers and was outrighted to El Paso.

Asencio spent the 2015 season in San Antonio, hitting .301/.329/.434 with 13 home runs and 74 RBI in 126 contests. He split time between San Antonio and El Paso to begin the 2016 season, but was released on June 6, 2016, after hitting a combined .267/.288/.335.

Tigres de Quintana Roo
On June 10, 2016, Asencio signed with the Tigres de Quintana Roo of the Mexican League. In 56 games to finish out the year, Asencio slashed .308/.338/.488 with 6 home runs and 43 RBI. He became a free agent from the Tigres de Quintana Roo after the 2016 season.

Ishikawa Million Stars
On March 31, 2017, he signed with the Ishikawa Million Stars of Baseball Challenge League. On August 18, he became a free agent.

Tecolotes de los Dos Laredos
On April 27, 2018, Asencio signed with the Tecolotes de los Dos Laredos of the Mexican League. He appeared in 27 games with the team, batting .273/.304/.382 with 2 home runs and 13 RBI. Asencio was released on June 5.

Diablos Rojos del México
On July 18, 2018, Asencio signed with the Diablos Rojos del México of the Mexican League. In 43 games with México, Asencio slashed .386/.432/.642 with 11 home runs and 37 RBI. After the season, Asencio was voted the best right fielder of the Mexican League for 2018. He was released on February 19, 2019.

Olmecas de Tabasco
On April 3, 2019, Asencio signed with the Olmecas de Tabasco of the Mexican League. He was released on April 15, despite hitting .324/.333/.531.

Leones de Yucatán
On April 16, 2019, Asencio signed with the Leones de Yucatán of the Mexican League. Asencio hit .315/.372/.517 with 13 home runs and 52 RBI in 70 games with the team, but was released on July 22, 2019.

Toros de Tijuana
On July 29, 2019, Asencio signed with the Toros de Tijuana of the Mexican League. In 25 games to finish out the season with Tijuana, Asencio slashed .260/.280/.385 with 3 home runs and 13 RBI. He was released after the season on October 7.

Piratas de Campeche
On July 6, 2021, Asencio signed with the Piratas de Campeche of the Mexican League.

References

External links

1989 births
Living people
Age controversies
Arizona League Padres players
Diablos Rojos del México players
Dominican Republic expatriate baseball players in Japan
Dominican Republic expatriate baseball players in Mexico
Dominican Republic expatriate baseball players in the United States
Dominican Summer League Padres players
El Paso Chihuahuas players
Estrellas Orientales players
Fort Wayne TinCaps players
Ishikawa Million Stars players
Lake Elsinore Storm players
Mexican League baseball right fielders
Olmecas de Tabasco players
San Antonio Missions players
Tigres de Quintana Roo players
Tecolotes de los Dos Laredos players
Toros de Tijuana players
Leones de Yucatán players
Tigres del Licey players
Tigres de Aragua players
Dominican Republic expatriate baseball players in Venezuela
Sportspeople from Santo Domingo